Huang Meishun (born 6 November 1907, date of death unknown) was a Chinese footballer. He competed in the men's tournament at the 1936 Summer Olympics.

He disappeared in 1938.

References

External links
 
 

1907 births
Year of death missing
Chinese footballers
China international footballers
Olympic footballers of China
Footballers at the 1936 Summer Olympics
Association football defenders
South China AA players